Renwal railway station is a railway station in Jaipur district, Rajasthan, India. Its code is RNW. It serves Renwal village. The station consists of 2 platforms. Passenger and express trains halt here.

Trains

The following trains halt at Renwal railway station in both directions:

 Chetak Express
 Indore–Bikaner Mahamana Express

References

Railway stations in Jaipur district
Jaipur railway division